The Malaysia–Singapore Second Link is a bridge connecting Singapore and Johor, Malaysia. In Singapore, it is officially known as the Tuas Second Link. The bridge was built to reduce the traffic congestion at the Johor–Singapore Causeway and was opened to traffic on 2 January 1998. It was officially opened by Singapore's then Prime Minister Goh Chok Tong with Mahathir Mohamad, who was then Prime Minister of Malaysia. The bridge supports a dual-three lane carriageway linking Kampong Ladang at Tanjung Kupang, Johor to Jalan Ahmad Ibrahim at Tuas, Singapore.
At Malaysian side, the bridge is connected to the Second Link Expressway (Malay: Lebuhraya Laluan Kedua Malaysia–Singapura) E3 also known as Linkedua Expressway, which links from Senai North Interchange Exit 253 at North–South Expressway E2, Senai Airport and Taman Perling, Johor Bahru via its extension known as Johor Bahru Parkway E3. In Singapore, the bridge connects to the Ayer Rajah Expressway.

The checkpoint on Malaysia side is called the Sultan Abu Bakar CIQ Complex (Kompleks Sultan Abu Bakar). Travelling along the Second Link usually takes less time than the Causeway due to smoother traffic in both directions; however, during festive periods (especially Chinese New Year, Hari Raya, Christmas and Deepavali) the dense traffic between Malaysia and Singapore still leads to massive jams on both bridges.

Unlike its shorter counterparts in Woodlands, as Tuas Checkpoint is designated as a vehicular checkpoint only, travellers are not allowed to walk along the lengthy Second Link and enter the checkpoint by foot.

Access from other roads

From Malaysia

The approach to the bridge is via the Second Link Expressway, which can be accessed by exiting the North–South Expressway (E2) at Exit 253 Senai North Interchange. Alternatively, motorists can also enter the expressway via Taman Perling which also joins with Pasir Gudang Highway (Federal Route 17 and Skudai Highway (Federal route 1). The expressway link to Taman Perling is also known as Pontian–Johor Bahru Parkway.

From Singapore
The bridge is directly accessed via the Ayer Rajah Expressway, along with other supporting roads around the vicinity of the Tuas industrial area.

History

The idea of building a second link between Malaysia and Singapore was first raised in July 1980 by then-Menteri Besar of Johor, Othman Saat. Gelang Patah was raised as a viable site due to its distant proximity from Johor Bahru, and the suggestion was raised to tackle growing traffic jams on the causeway. The Malaysian federal Government welcomed Othman's plan, and the Johor State Government formed a committee to study the feasibility of building the second link.

In July 1989, United Engineers Malaysia Berhad (UEM) submitted a proposal to the government of Malaysia to privatise the construction of a second link to Singapore. The acceptance of the proposal brought about the signing of a concession agreement in July 1993, giving exclusive rights and authority to UEM to design, construct, manage, operate and maintain the bridge and expressways for a period of 30 years commencing 27 July 1993.

Following this, a novation agreement was executed in May 1994, whereby UEM assigned all its rights, liabilities and obligations in respect of the concession agreement to Linkedua (Malaysia) Berhad, a wholly owned subsidiary of UEM.

The construction of the bridge required the co-operation of the government of Malaysia and the government of Singapore. On 22 March 1994, an inter-government agreement was signed defining the responsibilities of both governments with regard to the design, construction, operation, and maintenance of the bridge. Each government was responsible for the construction of the portion the bridge which fell within its borders, based on a common agreed design. A joint committee comprising representatives of each government was formed to oversee the implementation of this Malaysia–Singapore Second Crossing project.

The major components of the project are the Second Crossing bridge, forty-four kilometres of expressways, a Customs, Immigration and Quarantine complex, three toll plazas, two rest and service areas and other ancillary facilities. The bridge was designed to accommodate up to 200,000 vehicles a day.

The Second Link was opened to traffic on 2 January 1998. It was officially opened on 18 April the same year by the Prime Ministers of both countries, namely Dato' Seri Dr. Mahathir Mohamad of Malaysia and Goh Chok Tong of Singapore.

Toll charges

Tanjung Kupang Toll Plaza (Heading into Malaysia)

U-turn fees are also applicable (for U-turn back to Malaysia).
Singapore dollar is also accepted but at the rate of 1:1 (i.e. Pay S$1.00 for RM1.00)
Payment is made by Touch n Go card, and also by SmartTAG. Cash payments are not accepted.

Tuas Checkpoint (heading into Singapore)
(Fees reduced by 30% on 1 August 2010)

Payment is made by Autopass card (non-Singapore registered vehicles only), EZ-Link, NETS CashCard or NETS FlashPay (CEPAS Cards applicable). Cash payments are not accepted.

2020 Malaysia movement control order
On 16 March 2020, in response to the COVID-19 pandemic in Malaysia, Malaysia Prime Minister Muhyiddin Yassin announced that Malaysia would be implementing a movement control order which would start from 18 March. Due to the movement order, the Causeway faced immense jams due to a surge of Malaysians returning to Malaysia and back to Singapore before the order took effect. All bus services could not enter Johor Bahru for two weeks from 18 March to 31 March 2020. However, the flow of cargo, goods and food supplies would carry on as per normal.

Navigational channels
When travelling by sea, navigational aids consists of lights mounted on the bridge piers and lighted buoys placed at strategic navigational locations.

Technical specifications
Bridge Specifications
 Overall length of bridge: 
 Distance between both checkpoints: 
 Length within Malaysian waters: 
 Construction period: Oct 1994 to Oct 1997
 Total length of piles: 
 Total volume of concrete: 
 Total weight of reinforcing steel: 
 Total number of precast box segments: 840 units
 Longest span: 

Navigational Channels

Public transport
Causeway Link Routes CW3, CW4, CW6 and CW7 from Jurong East, Boon Lay & Tuas Link in Singapore to Bukit Indah, Gelang Patah, Pontian & Legoland in Malaysia cross the Second Link daily.

Transtar Travel Routes TS6 & TS6A from Buona Vista & Changi Airport via one-north & Tuas Link in Singapore to Legoland, Puteri Harbour & Gelang Patah Sentral in Malaysia cross the Second Link daily. Both routes stop at intermediate points on request.

See also

 Johor–Singapore Causeway

References

External links

Malaysia
 PLUS Expressway Berhad
 Malaysian Highway Authority

Singapore
 Land Transport Authority

Others
 Google Maps link showing the Second Link, with Tanjung Kupang, Malaysia, at left and Tuas, Singapore, at right.

South Johor Economic Region
Bridges in Johor
Bridges in Singapore
Tuas
Malaysia–Singapore border crossings
International bridges
Bridges completed in 1998
Toll bridges in Malaysia
1998 establishments in Malaysia
1998 establishments in Singapore
20th-century architecture in Singapore